Branchinecta sandiegonensis is a rare species of crustacean in the family Branchinectidae and the order Anostraca, the fairy shrimp. Its common name is San Diego fairy shrimp. It is native to southern California in the United States and Baja California in Mexico. It is a federally listed endangered species of the United States.

This fairy shrimp is 8 to 16 millimeters in length.

This organism occurs between Santa Barbara, California, and northwestern Baja California, with its distribution centered in San Diego County, California. It lives in vernal pool habitat. It has been identified at 137 vernal pool complexes, many of which have since been extirpated. Others, however, have been restored and preserved, and the shrimp has been reintroduced into appropriate pool habitat.

References

External links
IUCN Red List of Threatened Species — all species

sandiegonensis
Freshwater crustaceans of North America
Crustaceans of the United States
Fauna of the Baja California Peninsula
Fauna of California
Natural history of Baja California
Natural history of San Diego County, California
Taxonomy articles created by Polbot
ESA endangered species
Crustaceans described in 1993